Westland Tai Poutini National Park is a national park located on the western coast of New Zealand's South Island. The park borders the Aoraki/Mount Cook National Park along the Main Divide of the Southern Alps / Kā Tiritiri o te Moana, and includes many of the West Coast's glaciers, most notably including the Fox / Te Moeka o Tuawe and Franz Josef / Kā Roimata o Hine Hukatere glaciers.

The small tourist towns of Fox Glacier and Franz Josef / Waiau are the main settlements within the park, while remnants of old gold mining towns can be found along the coast. The park offers hunting opportunities for red deer, chamois, and tahr, while helicopters allow hunters to access the rugged, mountainous areas. The popular Copland Track runs upstream from the Karangarua River bridge. Along with the mountain scenery visible from the track, there are hot springs at Welcome Flat Hut.

Geography
Westland Tai Poutini National Park covers  exclusively on the western side of the South Island's main divide, making it New Zealand's fifth largest national park. The park covers a wide variety of environments, ranging from high alpine tundra near the park's border with Aoraki / Mount Cook National Park to coastal wetlands around Ōkārito Lagoon. The mountains are also responsible for the high degree of orographic rainfall which occurs in the park due to the prevailing westerlies, contributing in turn to the dense temperate rainforest found throughout the park.

See also
National parks of New Zealand
Conservation in New Zealand
Tramping in New Zealand

References

 
Westland District
Protected areas established in 1960
Protected areas of the West Coast, New Zealand
Southern Alps
1960 establishments in New Zealand